Homalium taypau is a species of plant in the family Salicaceae. It is endemic to Pitcairn.  It is threatened by habitat loss.

References

Flora of the Pitcairn Islands
taypau
Vulnerable plants
Taxonomy articles created by Polbot